William Cronan may refer to:

William P. Cronan (1879–1929), Governor of Guam and naval officer
William S. Cronan (1883–1959), Naval officer and Medal of Honor recipient

See also
William Cronon (born 1954), academic